Ulrich Wilhelm Koren (1747–1826) was a Norwegian civil servant and politician.  He served as the Bailiff of Sunnhordland and the governor of Stavanger county from 1799 until 1810.

He was the son of skipper and merchant in Bergen Niels Koren (1718–1784) and Kirstine Theting (1727–1779). He was first married on 20 May 1779 to Elisabeth Catharina Hagemann (1755–1789), daughter of Lieutenant Colonel Baltzar Christian Hagemann and Anne Marie Schmidt. She died in 1789 and then on 17 March 1790, he married Maren Laurentze Stub (1773–1804), daughter of parish priest Paul Schonevig Stub and Alida Elisabeth Abel.

Koren began working for a judge in Sunnhordland in 1763. In 1776, he became the acting judge for Sunnhordland while the judgeship was temporarily vacant. The same year he was also appointed bailiff for Sunnhordland. He served in that role until 1799 when he was appointed Governor of Stavanger Amt. He held that role until 1810 when he retired.

He was given the rank of Justice Councilor in 1795 and became a knight of the Order of the Dannebrog in 1812.

References

1747 births
1826 deaths
County governors of Norway